Nur ul-Huda is a Muslim male and female given name, formed from the elements Noor, al- and Huda, meaning light of the guidance. Notable persons with the name include:

Males
Mohammad Nurul Huda (born 1949), Bangladeshi poet and novelist and a musician 
Nurul Huda (CPI(M) politician) (born 1930), Indian politician

Females
Noor-ol-Hoda Mangeneh (born 1902), Iranian feminist writer
Nurul Huda Abdullah (born 1972), Malaysian swimmer

Arabic feminine given names
Arabic masculine given names
Iranian feminine given names